Historia Secreta (Secret History, in English) is a documentary series produced by The History Channel Latin America. It's the first of its type to be transmitted by this channel. It is produced by the Argentine production company Cuatro Cabezas. Until this moment, the show has found great success with two seasons and 13 episodes shown so far. The cities that have been shown are: Buenos Aires, Mexico City, Rosario, Guadalajara, Puebla, San Jose (Costa Rica), Santiago (Chile), Panama City, Caracas, Bogotá, Madrid, Medellín, Maracaibo, Monterrey and Havana.

The program is based on the idea of finding the secret stories that every city in Latin America has waiting to be discovered by the general public. In every episode there are interviews with historians and other experts to tell hidden stories or maybe secret facts behind the principal facts or characters of the history of that city. Every episode is hosted by a different host, who is an important figure in journalism, television or other areas.

Some of the next cities that are expected to be shown are São Paulo and Rio de Janeiro.

Historical television series